David A. Lewis is an American psychiatrist and neuroscientist, currently a Distinguished Professor of Psychiatry and Neuroscience, Thomas Detre Professor of Academic Psychiatry and also Director of Conte Center for Translational Mental Health Research at University of Pittsburgh.

References

Year of birth missing (living people)
Living people
American neuroscientists
American psychiatrists
University of Pittsburgh faculty
Members of the National Academy of Medicine